Released in 1981, Rockihnroll is the sixth studio album by Greg Kihn and the third album as The Greg Kihn Band. It produced the band's second highest-charting single to date, "The Breakup Song (They Don't Write 'Em)."

Track listing

Charts

Personnel
The Greg Kihn Band
Greg Kihn - lead vocals, rhythm guitar
Dave Carpender - lead guitar, backing vocals
Gary Phillips - keyboards, backing vocals
Steve Wright - bass, backing vocals, keyboards
Larry Lynch - drums, backing vocals, percussion

Production
Producer: Matthew King Kaufman
Engineers: Don Cody, Richard Corsello
Mastering: George Horn
Art direction: Ron Coro, Norm Ung
Artwork/Design: Mike Fink
Logistics: Brian Murray

References

1981 albums
Greg Kihn albums
Beserkley Records albums